Ishq o'yinlari - Games of Love is an Uzbek television drama that aired on Sevimli TV.

The series, produced by Ruslan Mirzayev, was shot in collaboration with Uzbek and Turkish filmmakers in three countries: Uzbekistan, Turkey and the United States. The main roles in the film were played by Uzbek actors Umid Irgashev, Saida Rametova, Jamila Gafurova and Turkish actors Gürkan Uygun, Beran Ozel and Sefa Zengin.

Plot
The protagonist of the series, Said’s wife Nigina, could not have children. The childless family adopts Said’s brother’s newborn baby. However, Said’s daughter-in-law eventually changed her mind. She suffers for giving her child to others, Said returns the baby to his daughter-in-law. The film shows the events that took place in this family.

Cast
 Umid Irgashev as Shohrux 
 Jamila Gafurova as Nigina
 Сардор Зоиров as Kamol
 Khamid Nizamov as Said
 Shokhrullo Abdullaev as Shokhrullo
 Saida Rametova as Oydin opa 
 Rihsitilla Abdullaev as Sanjar
 Gürkan Uygun as Iskandar
 Sefa Zengin as Kadir
 Umid Zokirov as Jovlon
 Beran Ozel  as Ozlem
 Emre Kerem as Serdar
 Muyassar Berdiqulova as Shahzoda Sobirovna
 Bahshillo Fatullayev as Ravshan aka
 Murat Aydin as Aziz
Ali Asghar Shah as  Ali Shah
 Barchin Gafurova  as Lola
 Azim Yoldoshev as Sharif
 Tahsin Lale as Mustafa
 Kemal Balibas as Jengiz
 Ekrem Ispir as Murat

References

External links
 

2021 Uzbekistani television series debuts
Uzbekistani television series
Uzbek-language television shows